The Lazu is a right tributary of the river Mureș in Transylvania, Romania. It discharges into the Mureș in Rapoltu Mare. Its name originates from the Hungarian, means “Fever Creek”.

References

Rivers of Romania
Rivers of Hunedoara County